The Sierra de Chinajá is a low karstic mountain range in Guatemala.

The mountain range is isolated from other ranges and forms the last major topographic landform  between the highlands of the Sierra de Chamá and the lowland plains of Petén.

See also
Geography of Guatemala

References

External links
 José Monzón Sierra - Guatemala's Geography

Chinaja